"15 Minutes of Shame" is the debut single by American country music artist Kristy Lee Cook, written by Kelly Archer, Casey Kessel and Justin Weaver. It was released in August 2008 from the album Why Wait.  The single is also her first entry on the Billboard country charts, reaching a peak of number 28 in November 2008.

Content
"15 Minutes of Shame" centralizes on the female narrator, who explains that she is going to tell everyone what she knows about her partner, who has been unfaithful and lied to her ("Every single lie you told, I'm tellin'"). She explains that "every girl in the world's gonna know [his] name", and that she hopes he enjoys his "15 minutes of shame" for his actions. The title is a play on  the famous quote by Andy Warhol about everyone getting 15 minutes of fame.

Reception
Common Sense wrote that the song is "a blend of mainstream pop with a country twang, and works surprisingly well in both musical styles and that the lyrics — full of sass and spunk — benefit from Cook's vocals and keep the single lighter and more fun despite the injections of bitterness and mean-spiritedness." "15 Minutes of Shame" got 3 stars from Common Sense.

Music video
The video for the song was released on the CMT website on October 30, 2008.

Chart performance
"15 Minutes of Shame" debuted at number 58 on the Hot Country Songs chart dated for the week of August 16, 2008, and entered the top 40 on the same chart for the week of October 18.

References

2008 songs
2008 debut singles
Kristy Lee Cook songs
Arista Nashville singles
Song recordings produced by Brett James
Songs written by Justin Weaver
Songs written by Kelly Archer